Alfred Short (1882 – 24 August 1938, London) was a British trades unionist and Labour politician, Member of Parliament (MP) for Wednesbury from 1918 to 1931, and for Doncaster from 1935 until 1938.

Alfred Short began his working life apprenticed to a boiler-maker at 5s. a week. He rose to become Secretary of the Sheffield Branch of the Boilermakers' Society from 1911 to 1919, and serve on Sheffield City Council from 1913 to 1919. He was also Secretary of the National Union of Docks, Wharves and Shipping Staffs. Elected an MP in 1918, Short continued other political activity: in 1922 he was chairman of the Management Committee of the General Federation of Trade Unions, and he was called to the Bar from Gray's Inn in 1923. He was Under-Secretary of State for the Home Department from 1929 to 1931. From 1931 to 1935, when he was out of the House of Commons, he worked for the Transport and General Workers' Union.

References

External links 
 

1882 births
1938 deaths
UK MPs 1918–1922
UK MPs 1922–1923
UK MPs 1923–1924
UK MPs 1924–1929
UK MPs 1929–1931
UK MPs 1935–1945
Labour Party (UK) MPs for English constituencies
British trade unionists
British boilermakers
General secretaries of British trade unions
Presidents of the General Federation of Trade Unions (UK)
United Society of Boilermakers-sponsored MPs
20th-century British businesspeople